Resentment is an emotion.

Resentment may also refer to:

 "Resentment" (Kesha song), a 2019 song by Kesha
 "Resentment" (Victoria Beckham song), a 2004 song by Victoria Beckham